Robert LaSardo is an American character actor.

Early life 
LaSardo was born in Brooklyn, New York. He began his career studying at the High School of Performing Arts in New York City where he became an honors student, before attending the Stella Adler Studio of Acting. He spent four years in the U.S. Navy. For two of those years, he handled Navy attack dogs in the Aleutian Islands.

Career
LaSardo started his acting career in 1987 with the independent film China Girl by Abel Ferrara. After several smaller roles he appeared in such TV series as The X-Files, CSI: Miami, Nip/Tuck and Femme Fatales, most often playing bad guys, in particular drug dealers or gang leaders. He also appeared in feature films as bad guys in several movies, including Waterworld and The Mule.

He has appeared often in independent horror movies, such as in The Human Centipede 3 (Final Sequence), Autopsy, and Parlor. In 2020, he appeared in Hope for the Holidays with Sally Kirkland.

In December 2021, it was reported that LaSardo has been cast in The Legend of Jack and Diane, a feature film described as a female-led revenge thriller written and directed by Bruce Bellocchi, starring Tom Sizemore, Lydia Zelmac, David Tomlinson and Carlo Mendez. The film's producers include Bellocchi, and filming began in Los Angeles on January 17, 2022.

In 2022, it was announced that LaSardo will be starring in the horror film Camp Pleasant Lake with Jonathan Lipnicki.

Personal life
LaSardo lives with his family in California.

Due to his work in the Navy, he supports USA Cares, an organization that supports families of soldiers.

Filmography

Films

Television

Books by LaSardo 
 2014 Life Sentence: A true story about love, lunacy and fame, CreateSpace Independent Publishing Platform, 
 2015 Playing With Fire, Glover Lane Press, 
 2017 Gabriel's Trial, CreateSpace Independent Publishing Platform,

References

External links
 
 Robert LaSardo Official Website 

1963 births
Living people
American male film actors
American male television actors
American people of Italian descent
Male actors from New York City
People from Brooklyn
United States Navy sailors
Fiorello H. LaGuardia High School alumni